Walter Reid (born 1869) was a Scottish professional footballer who played as a full-back.

References

1869 births
Scottish footballers
Association football fullbacks
St Bernard's F.C. players
Grimsby Town F.C. players
English Football League players
Year of death missing